The 1989–90 NBA season was the Mavericks' 10th season in the National Basketball Association. A year after missing the playoffs, the Mavericks received the eighth pick in the 1989 NBA draft, and selected Randy White out of Louisiana Tech, and later on fired head coach John MacLeod at the end of November, replacing with him Richie Adubato. However, things would not all go smoothly for the Mavericks as Roy Tarpley found himself in hot water again, as he was arrested in November for driving under the influence of drugs. The Mavericks played above .500 for the first half of the season, holding a 26–22 record at the All-Star break. As the season progressed, the team released Adrian Dantley to free agency; Dantley averaged 14.7 points per game in 45 games with the team. The Mavericks finished third in the Midwest Division with a 47–35 record.

Rolando Blackman led the team in scoring averaging 19.4 points per game, and was selected for the 1990 NBA All-Star Game, while Derek Harper averaged 18.0 points, 7.4 assists and 2.3 steals per game, and was named to the NBA All-Defensive Second Team. In addition, Tarpley provided the team with 16.8 points, 13.1 rebounds and 1.6 blocks per game, despite only playing just 45 games, while Sam Perkins contributed 15.9 points and 7.5 rebounds per game, and James Donaldson provided with 9.1 points and 8.6 rebounds per game.

In the Western Conference First Round of the playoffs, the Mavericks were swept by the Portland Trail Blazers in three straight games. This would be their final playoff appearance until 2001. The Blazers would lose to the defending champion Detroit Pistons in five games in the NBA Finals. Following the season, Perkins signed as a free agent with the Los Angeles Lakers.

Draft picks

Roster

Roster Notes
 Small forward Adrian Dantley was waived on April 2.
 Center James Donaldson holds both American and British citizenship.

Regular season

Season standings

z - clinched division title
y - clinched division title
x - clinched playoff spot

Record vs. opponents

Game log

Playoffs

|- align="center" bgcolor="#ffcccc"
| 1
| April 26
| @ Portland
| L 102–109
| Derek Harper (24)
| Roy Tarpley (14)
| Derek Harper (7)
| Memorial Coliseum12,884
| 0–1
|- align="center" bgcolor="#ffcccc"
| 2
| April 28
| @ Portland
| L 107–114
| Derek Harper (23)
| Roy Tarpley (17)
| Derek Harper (5)
| Memorial Coliseum12,884
| 0–2
|- align="center" bgcolor="#ffcccc"
| 3
| May 1
| Portland
| L 92–106
| Rolando Blackman (23)
| Roy Tarpley (15)
| Derek Harper (12)
| Reunion Arena17,007
| 0–3
|-

Player statistics

Season

Playoffs

Awards and records
 Derek Harper, NBA All-Defensive Second Team
 Rolando Blackman, NBA All-Star Game

Transactions

References

See also
 1989-90 NBA season

Dallas Mavericks seasons
Dallas
Dallas
Dallas